Heartstone may refer to:

 Heartstone (novel), a 2010 historical crime novel by C. J. Sansom
 Heartstone (film), a 2016 Icelandic film
 Heartstones, a 1987 novella by Ruth Rendell

See also 
 Hearthstone (disambiguation)